Melissa Glenn Haber (born 1969 as Melissa Sarah Haber) is a children's fiction author.

Born in Berkeley, California, she first began writing at age four in 1973. A graduate of the Commonwealth School and Harvard-Radcliffe College with a degree in comparative religion, Haber received an MA in public policy from University of California, Berkeley and an MA in American history from Brandeis University before settling into writing as a profession. The first of her works, The Heroic Adventure of Hercules Amsterdam, was published by Dutton Children's Books, after being rejected by sixteen other publishers. She has three other published young adult novels, entitled Beyond the Dragon Portal, The Pluto Project and Your Best Friend, Meredith (Hardcover Edition: "Dear Anjali"). Haber grew up in the greater Boston, Massachusetts area and currently lives in Somerville, Massachusetts, with her husband, Ezra, and their three children. Melissa Haber currently teaches American history classes at the Commonwealth School.

References

External links
Melissa Glenn Haber official site
Amazon author profile

1969 births
Radcliffe College alumni
Living people
American children's writers
Brandeis University alumni
University of California, Berkeley alumni
Commonwealth School alumni